Karl Pontus Norgren (born 22 April 1968) is the current guitarist of the Swedish power metal band HammerFall and formerly played guitar for The Poodles.

Biography 
Norgren replaced former HammerFall guitarist Stefan Elmgren, who decided to focus on his career as a pilot. Norgren was contacted by Joacim Cans, HammerFall's singer, who asked him if he knew a good guitarist. Being a fan of HammerFall's music and desiring to play a heavier style of music than that of The Poodles, Norgren suggested himself. HammerFall asserts that they are happy with Norgren as a guitarist and band member.

Norgren previously played with bands including Great King Rat, Talisman, Humanimal, The Ring, and Zan Clan.

He also served as live sound engineer for Thin Lizzy during the band's 2000 tour,  similarly serving Europe and Yngwie J. Malmsteen.

Recently, he joined The German Panzer as one of the group's 2nd guitarists.

Discography

Great King Rat
Great King Rat (1992)
Out of the Can (1999)

Jekyll-and-Hyde
Heavenly Creatures (1998)

Talisman
 Truth (1998)
 "Crazy" (1998) CD single from Truth
 Live at Sweden Rock Festival (2001)

Solo
Damage Done (2000)

Humanimal
Find My Way Home EP (2002)
Humanimal (2002)

Jeff Scott Soto
 Holding On EP (2002)
 Live at The Gods 2.002 (2003)

The Ring 
 Tales from Midgard (2004)

DivineFire 
Glory Thy Name (2004)

Zan Clan 
We Are Zan Clan...Who the F**K Are You??! (2005)

The Poodles 
Metal Will Stand Tall (2006)
Sweet Trade (2007)

"Night of Passion" (2006)
"Metal Will Stand Tall" feat. Tess Merkel (2006)
"Song for You" (2006)
"Seven Seas" feat. Peter Stormare (2007)
"Line of Fire" feat. E-Type (2008)
"Raise the Banner" (2008) Sweden's official song for the 2008 Beijing Olympic Games

Doogie White
As Yet Untitled (2008)

HammerFall
No Sacrifice, No Victory (2009)
Infected (2011)
(r)Evolution (2014)
Built to Last (2016)

Guest musician
Various Artists - Musically Correct III: The Eagle Has Landed (1999) "Brand New Start" from Damage Done
House of Shakira - III (2000) guitar solo on "In Your Head"
Locomotive Breath - Heavy Machinery (2002) guitar solo on "The Adventures of Zaphod Beeblebrox"
Various Artists - United: Where Is the Fire (2005) DVD
Talisman - 7 (2007) guest guitarist on "Final Curtain"
Tomas Bergsten's Fantasy - Nightwalker (2015) guitar solo on "In Eternity"

As producer, engineer, mixer
Human Clay - U4Ia (1997)
Four Sticks - Electric Celebration (1997) engineer, mixing
House of Shakira - Lint (1997) mixing (with Björn Wallmark)
House of Shakira - On the Verge (1998) mixing (with Björn Wallmark)
Southpaw - Southpaw (1998)
Clockwise - Naîve (1998) engineer (with Niklas Sjöberg)
Jekyll-and-Hyde - Heavenly Creatures (1998) engineer
Great King Rat - Out of the Can (1999) producer, mixing
Gaeleri - Still Here... (1999) co-producer, engineer
Pontus Norgren -  Damage Done (2000) producer
House of Shakira - III (2000) engineer, mixing
House of Shakira - Live +(2001) live sound engineer
Humanimal - Find My Way Home EP (2002) co-producer, engineer
Humanimal - Humanimal (2002) co-producer, engineer
Mercury Fang - Liquid Sunshine (2003) producer, mixing
The Ring - Tales from Midgard (2004) producer, engineer, mixing, mastering
Candlemass – Candlemass (2005) producer, engineer, mixing
Doogie White - As Yet Untitled (2008) producer, mixing
Last Autumn's Dream - Hunting Shadows (2008) mixing, mastering
Impulsia - Expressions (2009) co-producer, engineer
Rough Diamond - Stories from the Old Days (2012) mixing (with Marcus Jidell)

References

External links 
 Hammerfall MySpace
 Hammerfall Official Fanclub (Templars of Steel)
 Pontus Norgren - Official Website
 The Poodles - Official Website

Musicians from Stockholm
People from Haninge Municipality
Swedish heavy metal guitarists
Talisman (band) members
Living people
Lead guitarists
1968 births
HammerFall members
Melodifestivalen contestants of 2008